Edward Newton Whittier (July 1, 1840 – June 14, 1902) was a Union Army officer during the American Civil War. He took temporary command of the 5th Maine Battery when Captain Greenlief T. Stevens was wounded at the Battle of Gettysburg. Whittier received the Medal of Honor for gallantry during the Battle of Fisher's Hill near Strasburg, Virginia fought September 21–22, 1864. The battle was one of the engagements of the Valley Campaigns of 1864.

Medal of Honor citation
“The President of the United States of America, in the name of Congress, takes pleasure in presenting the Medal of Honor to First Lieutenant (Field Artillery) Edward Newton Whittier, United States Army, for extraordinary heroism on 22 September 1864, while serving with Battery 5, Maine Light Artillery, in action at Fisher's Hill, Virginia. While acting as assistant adjutant general, Artillery Brigade, 6th Army Corps, First Lieutenant Whittier went over the enemy's works, mounted, with the assaulting column, to gain quicker possession of the guns and to turn them upon the enemy.”

Whittier was later promoted to the rank of captain.

See also

List of Medal of Honor recipients
List of American Civil War Medal of Honor recipients: T-Z

References

External links
Military Times Hall of Valor

1840 births
1902 deaths
United States Army Medal of Honor recipients
Military personnel from Portland, Maine
People of Maine in the American Civil War
Union Army officers
American Civil War recipients of the Medal of Honor